Kolie Allen (born 17 March 2000) is an American tennis player.

Allen has a career-high doubles ranking by the WTA of 566, achieved on 25 July 2022. She has won one doubles title on the ITF Women's World Tennis Tour.

Allen won her biggest title to date at the 2022 The Women's Hospital Classic, where she partnered Ava Markham to win the doubles title.

ITF Circuit finals

Doubles: 1 (1 title)

References

External links
 
 
 Kolie Allen at Ohio State University

2000 births
Living people
American female tennis players
People from Lombard, Illinois
Ohio State Buckeyes women's tennis players
Tennis people from Illinois